August 2013

See also

References

 08
August 2013 events in the United States